A Dating Story is a Pie Town Productions, Banyan Productions, American-centric television show that featured a real-life matchmaker selecting two people whom the matchmaker always wanted to "fix up." The program then followed the new couple's pre-date preparations as well as the blind date itself. In June 2003, 8 episodes were filmed in Chicago.

A Dating Story was created to complement the shows A Wedding Story, A Baby Story, and A Makeover Story on The Learning Channel (TLC) and Discovery Channel. The show is no longer in production.

References

External links
 

2000s American reality television series
2000 American television series debuts
2004 American television series endings
TLC (TV network) original programming
Discovery Channel original programming